Love Lies is a 1989 Mexican drama film directed by Arturo Ripstein. It was entered into the 16th Moscow International Film Festival.

Cast
 Delia Casanova as Clara Zamudio
 Alonso Echánove as Israel Ordóñez
 Luisa Huertas as Pilar
 Guillermo Iván
 Fernando Palavicini as Ramiro
 Ernesto Yáñez as Matilde

References

External links
 

1989 films
1989 drama films
1980s Spanish-language films
Mexican drama films
Films directed by Arturo Ripstein
1980s Mexican films